Operation Vijiji (Operation Villagisation) was an exercise in social engineering carried out in post-colonial Tanzania in 1973. The operation involved the relocation, sometimes forced, of many thousands of rural Tanzanians to Ujamaa villages in order to facilitate communal farming and common services. The intention was that the whole rural population would move by 1976. The project was, and still is, controversial and was abandoned in the 1980s. Many people then attempted to return to their former homes, leading to widespread land disputes.

References

Political history of Tanzania